Magburaka Government Secondary School for Boys is a government-sponsored secondary school based in Magburaka, in the Tonkolili District, Sierra Leone. The school is one of the oldest secondary schools in Sierra Leone. The Magburaka Government Secondary School for Boys has a history of producing some of Sierra Leone's most prominent people, including current Sierra Leone's president Ernest Bai Koroma, minister of Education Minkailu Bah and writer, novelist and author Karamoh Kabba.

Notable alumni
Ernest Bai Koroma, president of Sierra Leone
Minkailu Bah, Sierra Leone minister of education 
Karamoh Kabba, Sierra Leonean author and novelist
Mohamed Kamarainba Mansaray, Sierra Leonean politician

Secondary schools in Sierra Leone
1946 establishments in Sierra Leone
Educational institutions established in 1946